Dutch Antilleans refers to Dutch people originating from the former Netherlands Antilles in the Caribbean. Some Dutch Antilleans also have a Surinamese background:
Arubans in the Netherlands
Bonaireans in the Netherlands
Curaçaoans in the Netherlands